I ragazzi del massacro is a 1968 crime novel by the Italian writer Giorgio Scerbanenco. It revolves a murder case where a young Northern Italian woman is found dead and naked in a classroom. It was the third installment in Scerbanenco's Milan Quartet about the medical doctor and investigator Duca Lamberti.

Publication
The novel was published in 1968 through Garzanti in Milan. It has been translated into French, Spanish, German, Dutch and Japanese.

Film adaptation
The novel was the basis for the 1969 Italian film Naked Violence. The film was directed by Fernando Di Leo and stars Pier Paolo Capponi as Lamberti.

References

External links
 Italian publicity page 

1968 novels
Italian crime novels
Italian mystery novels
Italian novels adapted into films
Italian-language literature
Novels by Giorgio Scerbanenco
Novels set in Milan
20th-century Italian novels